Jiří Kotrba (born 28 February 1958) is a Czech football manager and former player.

As a manager Kotrba led several Czech clubs, gaining success with some of them. In the 2002/2003 season he won the Czech First League with Sparta Prague. In 1994 Kotrba won the Czech Cup with Viktoria Žižkov, in 1998 he won the cup with FK Jablonec.

In June 2011, Kotrba returned to club management after a four-year break to replace Jaroslav Šilhavý as manager of České Budějovice. His return was, however, short-lived, as after overseeing a winless start to the 2011–12 Czech First League during which his team took no points from the opening five games, he was replaced as head coach by František Cipro, with Kotrba staying at the club in the role of general manager.

References

External links
  Article in the Hattrick magazine

1958 births
Living people
Sportspeople from Písek
Czech footballers
Czechoslovak footballers
SK Dynamo České Budějovice players
Czech football managers
Czechoslovak football managers
Czech First League managers
SK Dynamo České Budějovice managers
FK Jablonec managers
FK Viktoria Žižkov managers
1. FK Příbram managers
SK Sigma Olomouc managers
AC Sparta Prague managers
FC Zbrojovka Brno managers
FK Hvězda Cheb managers
Association football defenders
FC Slovan Liberec managers